Ka (hiragana: か, katakana: カ) is one of the Japanese kana, which each represent one mora. Both represent .  The shapes of these kana both originate from 加.

The character can be combined with a dakuten, to form が in hiragana, ガ in katakana and ga in Hepburn romanization.

A handakuten (゜) does not occur with ka in normal Japanese text, but it may be used by linguists to indicate a nasal pronunciation .

か is the most commonly used interrogatory particle. It is also sometimes used to delimit choices.

が is a Japanese case marker, as well as a conjunctive particle. It is used to denote the focus of attention in a sentence, especially to the grammatical subject.

Stroke order

The Hiragana か is made with three strokes:
 A horizontal line which turns and ends in a hook facing left.
 A curved vertical line that cuts through the first line.
 A small curved line on the right.

The Katakana カ is made with two strokes:
 A horizontal line which turns and ends in a hook facing left.
 A curved vertical line that cuts through the first line.

Other communicative representations

Braille representation

Computer encodings

References

See also

Specific kana